The Bellator MMA rankings, which was introduced in March 2021, is generated by a voting panel made up of media members. The media members are asked to vote for who they feel are the top fighters in the Bellator MMA by weight class and pound-for-pound.

Rules 
 New Fighter Eligibility:  A fighter must have competed once inside the Bellator cage on a current term with the company to be eligible.
 Inactivity:  A fighter is eligible to be ranked for up to 15-months without competing.
 Retirement:  A fighter remains eligible for 60 days after an indication of retirement, with the organization ultimately determining if the fighter remains active and eligible.
 Multiple Weight Classes: A fighter is allowed to be actively ranked in two different weight classes and is eligible to be ranked in an additional weight class once they have competed at least once in that division. 
 A fighter must actively compete in each weight class – a period of inactivity longer than 15 months in a given weight class will result in the removal from that specific weight class, but not necessarily from another division or the overall rankings pool. o    With the exception being that a fighter is actively participating in a World Grand Prix tournament in a different weight class.
 Removal/Ineligibility:  A fighter serving a non-medical suspension from an overseeing regulatory body and/or the organization for longer than six months will be removed from rankings eligibility. A fighter will remain eligible with a suspension of six months or fewer.
 Fighter Rankings Pool:  The final list of eligible fighters, and the weight classes in which they are eligible to be ranked, will ultimately be determined by the organization.
 Voting Frequency:  New Bellator rankings will only be voted on after every event, regardless of frequency.
 Votes will be due the Monday following a Bellator live event.
 First-Place Votes:  Each rankings period will reveal how many number one contender votes each fighter received.
 Voting Tabulation:  Tabulation of votes will be handled exclusively by Combat Registry, a third-party independent of Bellator MMA.
 Voting Panel:  Bellator fighter rankings will be voted on exclusively by media members within the MMA industry. 
 In no capacity, will Bellator staff, athletes, talent or other organization personnel participate in voting.

The inaugural voting panel will include the following members of the media:

 Jeff Cain – MMA Weekly
 Brian Campbell – CBS Sports
 Alexander Clausson – Kimura  
 Rodrigo Del Campo – Claro Sports   
 Rob DeMello – KHON Hawaii   
 Jason Floyd – The MMA Report    
 George Garcia – MMA Junkie  
 Amy Kaplan – FanSided    
 Nolan King – MMA Junkie   
 John Hyon Ko – South China Morning Post
 Mark LaMonica – Newsday
 Igor Lazarin – TASS Russia 
 Shakiel Mahjouri – CBS Sports
 Joe McDonagh – Cageside Press   
 John Morgan – MMA Junkie    
 Ken Pishna – MMA Weekly

Overview
 Last update (current ranking): March 14, 2023 
 Previous update (prior ranking):  February 28, 2023

Men's pound-for-pound

Women's pound-for-pound

Heavyweight

Light heavyweight

Middleweight

Welterweight

Lightweight

Featherweight

Bantamweight

Women's Featherweight

Women's Flyweight

See also 
 List of current Bellator fighters
 List of Bellator MMA champions
 List of undefeated mixed martial artists

References

External links 
 

Sports world rankings
UFC pound for pound ranking
Bellator MMA